Masin Secondary School is a government secondary school located in Masin, a village in Brunei-Muara District, Brunei. The school provides five years of secondary education, leading up to GCE 'O' Level examination.

See also 
 List of secondary schools in Brunei

External links 
 Masin Secondary School in VILIS
Secondary schools in Brunei
Cambridge schools in Brunei